The 2001 Angola train attack was an attack during the Angolan Civil War when on 10 August 2001 UNITA forces derailed a train travelling between towns of Zenza and Dondo with an anti-tank mine and then attacked the passengers with small arms fire.

History

The Angolan Civil War had been going on since 1975 and was a legacy of the cold war.  As part of its ongoing efforts to overthrow the government, the 2001 Angola train attack occurred on 10 August 2001 when a passenger train in Angola hit an anti-tank mine placed on the track by National Union for the Total Independence of Angola (UNITA) rebels. After its derailment, rebels attacked the passengers with gunfire, killing around 250 people of the 500 who were on the train.
On 16 August 2001, members of the United Nations Security Council strongly condemned the attack, calling it a "terrorist attack".

On August 13,  UNITA took responsibility for the attack.

See also 
Angolan Civil War
Transport in Angola
List of terrorist incidents involving railway systems

References 
Notes

Bibliography

 - Total pages: 922 
 - Total pages: 2941 

August 2001 crimes
Attacks in Africa in 2001
Mass murder in 2001
Terrorist incidents in Africa in 2001
Train wrecks caused by sabotage
2001 in Angola
Railway accidents in 2001
Terrorist incidents in Angola
Derailments in Angola
Massacres in 2001
August 2001 events in Africa
2001 crimes in Angola
2001 disasters in Angola